The 2001–02 Danish 1st Division season was the 57th season of the Danish 1st Division league championship and the 16th consecutive as a second tier competition governed by the Danish Football Association.

The division-champion and runner-up promoted to the 2002–03 Danish Superliga. The teams in the 15th and 16th relegated to the 2002–03 Danish 2nd Division.

Table

Top goalscorers

See also
 2001–02 in Danish football
 2001–02 Danish Superliga

External links
 Peders Fodboldstatistik

Danish 1st Division seasons
Denmark
2001–02 in Danish football